Pterostylis perculta, commonly known as the ruddy hood is a plant in the orchid family Orchidaceae and is endemic to the south-west of Western Australia. Both flowering and non-flowering plants have a relatively large rosette of leaves and flowering plants have up to five reddish-brown and white flowers with relatively short tips on the sepals.

Description
Flowering plants have a rosette at the base of the flowering stem but the leaves are usually withered by flowering time. The dorsal sepal and petals form a hood or "galea" over the column with the dorsal sepal having a short point on its end. The lateral sepals turn downward with short tips curving forwards. The labellum is small, almost glabrous, dark brown and insect-like. Flowering occurs from September to November.

Taxonomy and naming
This orchid was first formally described in 2014 by Mark Clements and Christopher French and given the name Oligochaetochilus percultus from a specimen collected near Cascade and the description was published in Australian Orchid Review. In 2015 David Jones changed the name to Pterostylis perculta "to allow for the different taxonomic views". It has previously been known as Pterostylis sp. 'Ongerup'. The specific epithet (perculta) a Latin word meaning "highly adorned".

Distribution and habitat
The ruddy hood grows in rocky soil in shrubland and mallee woodland between the Stirling Range and the Thomas River.

Conservation
Pterostylis perculta  is classified as "not threatened" by the Western Australian Government Department of Parks and Wildlife.

References

perculta
Endemic orchids of Australia
Orchids of Western Australia
Plants described in 2014